The Nashville-class ironclad was a class of three side-wheel casemate ironclads built for the Confederate States Navy during the American Civil War. Only the lead ship of the class, was commissioned into Confederate States Navy service; two sister ships were broken up on the stocks before they were completed.

Ships

Notes

References
 
 
 
 

 
Ironclad classes